Profundimitra planofilum is a species of sea snail, a marine gastropod mollusk in the family Mitridae, the miters or miter snails.

Description
Shell up to 32 mm in length, acuminate and slender. Color white, semitransparent at apex and porcelaneous near body. Spire sides are straight while whorl sides are slightly convex, and sutures are simple and prominent. Protoconch has 2.5 to 3 glassy and conoidal whorls. Teleoconch has 8 to 8.5 whorls.

Distribution
Indo-Pacific, South China Sea, north to Taiwan and to the waters off Pratas Island, 200 to 600 m deep. The holotype has been caught by a fishing boat off north Taiwan. Two paratypes come from fishing boats working around Pratas Island.

References

Mitridae
Gastropods described in 2011